Haunt Me, Haunt Me Do It Again is the debut studio album by Canadian electronic musician Tim Hecker, released on November 20, 2001, on Substractif, a sub-label of Alien8 Recordings. The album mixes the digital signal processing of glitch with post-rock structures and melodies. The sounds used for this album, as well as most of Tim Hecker’s other works, originate from a guitar, piano, and laptop. The title of the song "The Work of Art in the Age of Cultural Overproduction" is a reference to Walter Benjamin's essay, "The Work of Art in the Age of Mechanical Reproduction". The track "Ghost Writing Pt. 1" samples the American television show Who Wants to be a Millionaire?.

In 2010, the album was re-released on vinyl and digipack CD.

Track listing

Artwork
The album's cover art is a photograph showing the upper facades and parapets of brick and stucco buildings. The location is somewhere in Barcelona, Spain based on the style, quality of materials and green awnings seen the lower part of the photograph. The antennae are pointing to the left in the photo, suggesting the location is somewhere in the east part of Barcelona, because the antennae are likely pointed at the TV tower, Torre de Collserola.

References

External links
Tim Hecker Discography

2001 debut albums
Tim Hecker albums
Alien8 Recordings albums